This is a list of seasons completed by the Harvard Crimson football team of the National Collegiate Athletic Association (NCAA) Division I Football Championship Subdivision (FCS). Since the team's founding, the Crimson have participated in over 1,300 officially sanctioned games, with an all-time record of 879–403–50. Harvard originally competed as a football independent before joining the Ivy League in 1956 as a founding member.

Seasons

See also 
 List of Ivy League football standings

References

Harvard

Harvard Crimson football seasons